Peter Charles Doherty  (born 15 October 1940) is an Australian immunologist and Nobel laureate. He received the Albert Lasker Award for Basic Medical Research in 1995, the Nobel Prize in Physiology or Medicine jointly with Rolf M. Zinkernagel in 1996 and was named Australian of the Year in 1997. In the Australia Day Honours of 1997, he was named a Companion of the Order of Australia for his work with Zinkernagel. He is also a National Trust Australian Living Treasure. In 2009 as part of the Q150 celebrations, Doherty's immune system research was announced as one of the Q150 Icons of Queensland for its role as an iconic "innovation and invention".

Early life and education
Peter Charles Doherty was born in the Brisbane suburb of Sherwood on 15 October 1940, to Eric Charles Doherty and Linda Doherty (née Byford). He grew up in Oxley, and attended Indooroopilly State High School (which now has a lecture theatre named after him).

After receiving his bachelor's degree in veterinary science in 1962 from the University of Queensland, he was a rural veterinary officer for the Queensland Department of Agriculture and Stock before taking up laboratory-based work at the Department's Animal Research Institute. There he met microbiology graduate Penelope Stephens and they were married in 1965. Doherty received his master's degree in veterinary science in 1966 from the University of Queensland. 
 
He obtained his PhD in pathology in 1970 from the University of Edinburgh, Scotland, then returned to Australia to continue his  research at the John Curtin School of Medical Research within the Australian National University in Canberra.

Research and career
Doherty's research focuses on the immune system and his Nobel work described how the body's immune cells protect against viruses. He and Rolf Zinkernagel, the co-recipient of the 1996 Nobel Prize in Physiology or Medicine, discovered how T cells recognise their target antigens in combination with major histocompatibility complex (MHC) proteins.

Viruses infect host cells and reproduce inside them. Killer T-cells destroy those infected cells so that the viruses cannot reproduce. Zinkernagel and Doherty discovered that, in order for killer T cells to recognise infected cells, they had to recognise two molecules on the surface of the cell – not only the virus antigen, but also a molecule of the major histocompatibility complex (MHC). This recognition was done by a T-cell receptor on the surface of the T cell. The MHC was previously identified as being responsible for the rejection of incompatible tissues during transplantation. Zinkernagel and Doherty discovered that the MHC was responsible for the body fighting meningitis viruses too.

Awards and honours
Doherty was elected a Fellow of the Royal Society (FRS) in 1987. In 1997, he received the Golden Plate Award of the American Academy of Achievement. He is the patron of the eponymous Peter Doherty Institute for Infection and Immunity (Doherty Institute), a joint venture between the University of Melbourne and Melbourne Health. It houses a group of infection and immunology experts, including Director Professor Sharon Lewin, who are charged with leading the battle against infectious diseases in humans. This became operational in 2014. He became an Honorary Fellow of the Academy of Medical Sciences (FMedSci) in 2015. In the same year he was elected Fellow of the Australian Academy of Health and Medical Sciences (FAHMS). In April 2017 he was inducted as a Fellow of the Royal Society of Victoria (FRSV).

John Monash Science School, Moreton Bay Boys College, and Murrumba State Secondary College each have a house named after him.

Non academic publications

Personal life
, Peter Doherty and his wife Penny live in Melbourne. They have two sons, Michael, a neurologist working in the United States, and James, a Melbourne-based barrister, and six grandchildren.

Doherty currently spends three months of the year conducting research at St. Jude Children's Research Hospital in Memphis, Tennessee, where he is a faculty member at the University of Tennessee Health Science Center through the College of Medicine. For the other 9 months of the year, he works in the Department of Microbiology and Immunology at the University of Melbourne, Victoria.

References

External links

Noble Prize biographical information (including his Nobel Lecture on "Cell Mediated Immunity in Virus Infections")
 
 Radio Interview from This Week in Science 5 September 2005 broadcast
 "Winning a Nobel: easy as wrestling a pig", by Margaret Wertheim, Cosmos magazine, October 2006
 Peter Doherty delivers the opening address at the 2009 Melbourne Festival of Ideas on ABC Fora (video)
  (video)

1940 births
Living people
Foreign associates of the National Academy of Sciences
Foreign Members of the Russian Academy of Sciences
Alumni of the University of Edinburgh
Academic staff of the Australian National University
Australian Nobel laureates
Nobel laureates in Physiology or Medicine
Australian of the Year Award winners
Companions of the Order of Australia
Australian immunologists
Australian veterinarians
Male veterinarians
People from Brisbane
Fellows of the Australian Academy of Science
Fellows of the Australian Academy of Health and Medical Sciences
University of Queensland alumni
Fellows of the Royal Society
Recipients of the Albert Lasker Award for Basic Medical Research
Queensland Greats
Australian republicans